The Rockaway River is a tributary of the Passaic River, approximately 35 mi (56 km) long, in northern New Jersey in the United States. The upper course of the river flows through a wooded mountainous valley, whereas the lower course flows through the populated New Jersey suburbs and former industrial area west of New York City. It drains an area of approximately 130 sq mi (340 km²).

It rises in the Oak Ridge neighborhood of Jefferson Township. It flows SSW, in a direct course between in the valley between the mountain ridges. Northeast of Wharton it emerges from the mountains and flows generally east in a meandering course, past Wharton, Dover (where it enters a concrete channel), Rockaway, Denville and Boonton, where it passes through the Boonton Gorge.  The gorge begins with the impressive 25 foot Boonton Falls. It continues for a little over 1 mile (1.6 km) dropping around  through nearly continuous class 3 and 4 whitewater. On the south side of Boonton it is impounded to form the Boonton Reservoir. Downstream from the reservoir dam it flows south, through Lake Hiawatha, where the river splits and joins again.  It then flows through  Parsippany and into Hatfield Swamp, where it is joined by the Whippany River and then merges with the Passaic River.

Beaver brook is a stream that flows through a swamp and enters the Rockaway River in Denville.

In the 19th century the river connected to the Morris Canal near Wharton and served as an industrial transportation link for shipping coal and iron ore between Pennsylvania and New York City. The communities of Wharton, Dover, and Boonton were important iron processing towns in the early 19th century, with a large concentration of forges and mills. The significant pollution problem in the lower course of the river has been somewhat alleviated by legislation and by the nearly complete abandonment of heavy industry in the area.

The isolated upper course of the river is a popular region site for smallmouth bass fishing.

The New Jersey Fish and Game stocks the river in many sections with rainbow and brown trout.  Many fisherman find enjoyment in fishing the river.

The river is shown in the movie, The Station Agent, and also appears in one episode of The Sopranos.

Flooding
The Rockaway River has the potential to cause flooding in the area of Denville that is north of the central business district, including residential areas along the river. During the massive flooding following Hurricane Irene in August 2011, the Rockaway River crested approx. 6 feet above its previous record flood level. The flooding was considered to be a 500-year event. The downtown Denville business district and surrounding residential areas were flooded, by in some places up to 8 feet of water. As silt has accumulated in the river basin, the average depth of the river has steadily decreased. Since the  flooding of Irene there have been no problems reported with the river overreaching its banks. Discussions are ongoing with the Township of Denville and the Army Corps of Engineers as to a solution, including the control of dams upstream which may have contributed to the downtown flooding.

Tributaries
 Den Brook
 Whippany River

See also
 List of New Jersey rivers

External links
 New Jersey Skylands: The Rockaway River
 U.S. Geological Survey: NJ stream gaging stations
 – Mouth of the river

Rivers of Morris County, New Jersey
Tributaries of the Passaic River
Rivers of New Jersey